Kin Bineola is an Ancestral Puebloan great house and archeological site located  from Pueblo Bonito in Chaco Culture National Historical Park, New Mexico, United States. Construction on the core of the building, which is E-shaped, began in the early 10th century; it was significantly remodeled and enlarged during the 12th century. At its peak Kin Bineola contained nearly 200 rooms and 10 kivas, with an associated great kiva nearby. Irrigation canals have been uncovered at the site, which lies north of Kin Bineola Wash, where several small house sites have been found.

References

Bibliography

 

Archaeological sites in New Mexico
Chaco Canyon
Chaco Culture National Historical Park
Colorado Plateau
Ancestral Puebloans